Let's Eat 3 is a 2018 South Korean television series starring Yoon Doo-joon and Baek Jin-hee. This is the third season of 2013 Let's Eat series, with Yoon Doo-joon reprising his role as Goo Dae-young in both the first and second season. It aired on tvN from July 16 to August 28, 2018.

Synopsis
Goo Dae-young has fallen into a slump in his thirties. In order to heal his wounds, he embarks on a journey to revisit the food that he loved in his twenties with former college classmate Lee Ji-woo, and the two not only share their meals but also relive their memories of the past.

Cast

Main
 Yoon Doo-joon as Goo Dae-young 
 Baek Jin-hee as Lee Ji-woo
 Lee Joo-woo as Lee Seo-yeon 
 Ahn Woo-yeon as Sunwoo Sun

Recurring
 Byung Hun as Kim Jin-seok 
 Kim Dong-young as Bae Byung-sam
 Yang Kyung-won as Jang
 Seo Byeock-joon as Lee Sung-joo
 Noh Susanna as Heo Yoon-ji
 Lee Ji-hyun as Kim Mi-sook
 Park Han-sol as Bak Han-sol
 Shin Soo-hang
 Byun Woo-seok

Special appearances
 Seo Hyun-jin as Baek Su-ji (ep. 2) 
 Lee Joo-seung as Ahn Chan-soo (ep. 1)

Production
The first script reading was held on May 17, 2018.

The series was reduced from 16 to 14 episodes due to the sudden draft notice of lead actor Yoon Doo-joon.

Original soundtrack

Part 1

Part 2

Part 3

Part 4

Part 5

Part 6

Part 7

Ratings

References

External links
  

 

Korean-language television shows
TVN (South Korean TV channel) television dramas
2018 South Korean television series debuts
2018 South Korean television series endings
South Korean romantic comedy television series
Sequel television series
Television series by Celltrion Entertainment